Rickie Lee Jones is the debut studio album by American singer-songwriter Rickie Lee Jones, released on February 28, 1979 by Warner Bros. Records.

Background

Jones had begun playing live in the Los Angeles area at the age of 21, and after meeting singer-songwriter Alfred Johnson, the pair began writing and performing live together (most notably at the Ala Carte club.) Two of their collaborations, "Weasel and the White Boys Cool" and "Company," would later be recorded for Jones' debut album. She also sang jazz standards, as well as a song penned by her father ("The Moon Is Made of Gold") in her live sets.

Jones' performances around Los Angeles aroused interest from other local songwriters, as well as local record company executives. At a label showcase, Jones performed originals, including "Chuck E.'s in Love", "The Real Thing Is Back in Town" and "The Moon Is Made of Gold." This showcase performance, plus a demo containing "The Last Chance Texaco", "Easy Money", "Young Blood" and "After Hours" led to a record deal with Warner Bros. For her major label debut, Jones scrapped "The Real Thing Is Back in Town," but used the titular line in one of the album's tracks – "Coolsville."

Recording sessions (which began in September 1978) yielded eleven songs for inclusion on an album. Two of the songs – "On Saturday Afternoons in 1963" and "After Hours" – were recorded live on December 22, 1978.

Cover image
The album cover photo was taken by Norman Seeff, and the art direction and design was by Mike Salisbury.

Reception 

A retrospective review from AllMusic stated; "With her expressive soprano voice employing sudden alterations of volume and force, and her lyrical focus on Los Angeles street life, Rickie Lee Jones comes on like the love child of Laura Nyro and Tom Waits on her astounding self-titled debut album that simultaneously sounds like a synthesis of many familiar styles and like nothing that anybody's ever done before."

The lead single "Chuck E.'s in Love" peaked at No. 4 on the U.S. Billboard Hot 100, while the album peaked at No. 3 on the Billboard 200. The album was further promoted by a performance on Saturday Night Live in April 1979, where she performed "Chuck E.'s in Love" and "Coolsville". A second single, "Young Blood", peaked at No. 40 on the Billboard Hot 100 in late 1979. The album was certified Platinum by the Recording Industry Association of America on August 7, 1979, for sales of one million copies. The album was also certified Silver in the UK and 2x Platinum in Australia.

Awards

Track listing
Credits adapted from the album's liner notes.

 "Chuck E.'s in Love"  3:28
 "On Saturday Afternoons in 1963" – 2:31
 "Night Train" – 3:14
 "Young Blood" – 4:04 
 "Easy Money" – 3:16
 "The Last Chance Texaco" – 4:05
 "Danny's All-Star Joint" – 4:01
 "Coolsville" – 3:49
 "Weasel and the White Boys Cool" (Jones, Alfred Johnson) – 6:00
 "Company" (Jones, Alfred Johnson) – 4:40
 "After Hours (Twelve Bars Past Goodnight)" – 2:13

Personnel

Rickie Lee Jones – vocals, keyboards, percussion, guitar, backing vocals, horn arrangements
Dr. John – keyboards
Michael McDonald – backing vocals
Randy Newman – synthesizer
Victor Feldman – percussion, drums, keyboards
Tom Scott – horns
Ralph Grierson – keyboards
Michael "Bobby" Boddicker – synthesizer
Red Callender – bass
Nick DeCaro – accordion; orchestral arrangements on "On Saturday Afternoons in 1963", "Night Train" and "After Hours"
Buzz Feiten – guitar
Chuck Findley – horns
Steve Gadd – drums
Randy Kerber – keyboards
Neil Larsen – keyboards
Arno Lucas – backing vocals
Johnny Mandel – orchestral arrangements on "Coolsville" and "Company"
Andy Newmark – drums
Jeff Porcaro – drums
Leslie Smith – backing vocals
Mark Stevens – drums, percussion
Fred Tackett – guitar, mandolin
Joe Turano – backing vocals
Ernie Watts – horns
Willie Weeks – Fender bass
Matthew Weiner – backing vocals
Technical
Penny Ringwood – production assistant
Lee Herschberg, Loyd Clifft – engineer
Roger Nichols, Tom Knox – additional engineering
Mike Salisbury – art direction, cover design
Norman Seeff – cover photography

Charts

Weekly charts

Year-end charts

Certifications

References

External links
Rickie Lee Jones's Official Website

Rickie Lee Jones albums
1979 debut albums
Albums arranged by Johnny Mandel
Albums produced by Lenny Waronker
Albums produced by Russ Titelman
Warner Records albums